This page lists some of the many Caladium cultivars. There are over 1000 named cultivars of Caladium bicolor alone.

References

Garden plants